"Made in Heaven" was an American television play broadcast on December 6, 1956, as part of the CBS television series, Playhouse 90.  It was the 10th episode of the first season of Playhouse 90.

Plot
A zany comedy in which a married couple, Zachary and Elsa Meredith, separates due to a series of misunderstandings and begins to date others.

Cast
 Imogene Coca as Elsa Meredith
 Robert Preston as Zachary Meredith
 Phyllis Kirk as Nancy Tennant
 Jacques Bergerac as Laszlo Vertes
 Eddie Mayehoff as Philip Dunlap
 Sheila Bond as June
 Benay Venuta as Marian Hunt
 Mark Roberts as Mr. Tennant
 Benny Baker as Bartender

Peter Lawford hosted the broadcast.

Production
Martin Manulis was the producer and Ralph Nelson the director.  Hagar Wilde wrote the teleplay, based on her 1946 stage play, Made in Heaven. The production was broadcast live on December 6, 1956.

Reception

References

1956 American television episodes
Playhouse 90 (season 1) episodes
1956 television plays